JJ Appleton, born Jon Jason Appleton, is an American musician and singer-songwriter based in New York City who has toured throughout the United States extensively in support of his own records and also with other bands including Jamie Cullum, Newton Faulkner, Pete Yorn, Edwin McCain, Sister Hazel, Joan Osborne, Keb Mo, Hootie and the Blowfish. Appleton has been described by the Washington Post as a songwriter with a "pop-rock sound but with considerably more edgy energy, adding figurative lightning to the stormy night." Previously a member of the popular New York band The Grasshoppers, Appleton released his first solo album 500 Moments in 2003 which led to appearances on the NBC television show Last Call with Carson Daly, a feature on E!'s Wild On, and a national affiliation with Budweiser's True Music Live program and Gibson Guitars. Appleton released his album Uphill to Purgatory in the United States in 2005 which was then re-released in the United Kingdom in 2006 as Someone Else's Problem and included three songs from the 500 Moments EP.  Based on the recognition he was receiving in England, Appleton decided to move to London in 2006 where he became a regularly featured performer at popular venues such as Ronnie Scott's, The Borderline, and The Regal Room.  In the meantime, the single "Walk Into The Room" and its accompanying video became a favorite on English radio and MTV Two. In 2015, Appleton released an acoustic blues album entitled "Dirty Memory" with harmonicist Jason Ricci.

Early life 

Appleton was born in Norwich, Vermont, on April 4, 1967, the son of Georganna Towne and Jon H. Appleton, a composer and professor of electro-acoustic music at Dartmouth College.  Professor Appleton was also one of the co-inventors of the Synclavier digital music synthesizer and recording system, which JJ would later use as a producer in New York City to record his own and other artists' music.  In his capacity as a performer and a teacher, Jon Appleton was able to bring his family with him around the world where they would sometimes live for extended periods of time. Wherever the Appletons went, Jon had a musical agenda, which afforded JJ the rare opportunity to immerse himself in the indigenous music of such exotic places as Tonga, Sweden, Israel and Turkey." JJ has attributed his mother's support, quoted as saying "She definitely encouraged my musical pursuits. She would tape record me singing twenty minute songs about Viking battles and spaghetti when I was 6".

Early career 
While attending Berklee College of Music in Boston, Appleton met and played in several bands including a stint with the power funk outfit Hamhorta and the band Electric Jellyfish. Appleton's primary instrument was guitar and as a developing guitarist, Appleton was a fan of Albert King, Stevie Ray Vaughan and Johnny Winter. During this time, he wrote and recorded a considerable amount of original material that reflected his respect for and developing mastery of the blues guitar and singing styles of these artists. Upon moving to New York City in the early 1990s, Appleton worked at producer Mike Thorne's Synclavier-based recording studio as an engineer and Synclavier programmer where he continued to develop his skills on records by Betty, Information Society, and Peter Murphy.

Work as songwriter, composer, music consultant and producer 
Appleton has co-written, produced and performed on songs for a wide range of performers, including Jimmy Somerville, China Crisis, Stephen Schwartz, Farrad, Taboo of the Black Eyed Peas, Luan Parle, Ke$ha, Darius Rucker, Ben Adams/A1, Pebe Sebert, Marc Copely, Ashford & Simpson, Stephen Lironi, Erin Bowman, and David Wolfert.

He has composed and performed music for numerous television programs and films, including Jungle Junction, Ten Days That Unexpectedly Changed America, PBS's P.O.V., The Wire, The Sopranos, The Oprah Winfrey Show, Real World Cancun, Real World Washington DC, The Regis and Kathie Lee Show, and Lizzie McGuire. He may be best known to Millennials for singing the Pokémon: Advanced Generation series’ theme song.

As a music consultant, Appleton has been featured at music industry meetups, teaching advertising, TV, and film composition.

Appleton's career as a jingle writer has spanned over 15 years, and his compositions can be heard in television commercials for Diet Coke, Burger King, McDonald's, Time Warner Cable, BMW, Singulair, Levitra, IBM, Clairol, Maybelline Cosmetics, Budweiser, 7-up, American Express, Procter and Gamble, and Campbell's Soup.

Collaboration with Jason Ricci 
In 2014/2015, Appleton teamed up with Grammy Award-winning harmonica player and singer Jason Ricci to record an Acoustic blues album entitled "Dirty Memory," which Appleton also produced.  Hailed as "keeping the tradition of Piedmont blues alive" and "a killer, wild man of a set that almost sounds like early Holy Modal Rounders played straight," the album spent 10 weeks on the Roots Music Report's Top 50 Acoustic Blues Albums chart. Six of the tracks from "Dirty Memory" dominated the Top 10 Acoustic Blues Singles chart in the autumn of 2015, and in November 2015 "Dirty Memory" was given the 2015 Jimi Award for "best new artist debut" by Blues 411.

Tours and notable appearances 

Appleton has toured the United States and UK extensively and has worked as a session musician/band leader with members of Gov't Mule, Tedeschi Trucks, Black Crowes, Lenny Kravitz, The Spin Doctors, and John Scofield bands.

In November 2015, Appleton was chosen to be one of two guitarists (along with Chris McQueen of Snarky Puppy) in the New York Theatre Workshop’s production of Lazarus, starring Michael C. Hall and Cristin Milioti and co-written by David Bowie and Enda Walsh. The play features new and revamped songs by Bowie, and is based on Walter Tevis’ novel The Man Who Fell to Earth.

In 2016, Appleton toured extensively as guitarist/vocalist with Americana band JD and the Straight Shot, co-billing with Jewel, Don Henley and Joe Walsh.

Notable live and television appearances include:
 Tribute Concert Celebrating Bob Dylan’s Birthday, featuring Chris Barron, Buddy Cage, and Chris Harford. B.B. King's Blues Club. New York, May 26, 2003 
 Last Call with Carson Daly, 2006 
 BBC's Strictly Come Dancing, featuring Donny Osmond, October 6, 2014 
 Apollo Theater Spring Gala, featuring Nile Rodgers, Rosanne Cash, Ne-Yo, and Luke James. Apollo Theater. New York, June 8, 2015 
 The Late Show with Stephen Colbert, with Michael C. Hall and the cast of the play Lazarus, December 17, 2015

Albums 
 500 Moments (2003)
 Uphill To Purgatory (2005)
 Someone Else's Problem (2006)
 Black And White Matinee (2008)
 Dirty Memory (2015)

Current band lineup 
 Brian Delaney – drums
 Tim Lefebvre – bass
 Matt Anthony – guitars
 Thad DeBrock – guitars, keyboards
 Bob Knight – drums
 Jay Cox – bass
 Dan Minsteris – piano
 Josh Dion – piano

Previous bands 

Appleton is one of the founding members of the popular New York based band The Grasshoppers along with Mario Joachim and David Hamburger. The Grasshoppers, who counted among their fans Paul McCartney, Jeff Buckley and the conductor Seiji Ozawa, have been described in reviews as "One of the most influential and melodic rock / pop bands on the New York City Scene in the mid 1990s."

References

External links
 JJ Appleton Site
 JJ Appleton United Kingdom Site

American rock guitarists
American male guitarists
American singer-songwriters
American rock singers
American rock songwriters
American male singer-songwriters
Living people
1967 births
21st-century American guitarists
21st-century American male singers
21st-century American singers